The 2019 New South Wales Waratahs season was the club's 23rd season since the inception of the Super Rugby in 1996.

Squad

Coaching and management

Current squad

The squad for the 2019 season:

Transfers

In:

Out:

Season summary

Season results

Standings

Statistics

Notes

References

External links
 Waratahs Official website
 Australia Super Rugby website
 SANZAR website

2019
2019 Super Rugby season by team
2019 in Australian rugby union